Dan N. Johnson is an American politician and retired educator serving as a member of the Utah House of Representatives from the 4th district. He assumed office on January 1, 2019.

Education 
Johnson earned a Bachelor of Science degree in education from Peru State College, a Master of Science in secondary education from the University of Nebraska Omaha, an EdD in educational leadership from Argosy University, and an EdS in educational administration from University of Nebraska–Lincoln.

Career 
Prior to entering politics, Johnson served as assistant superintendent of the Tooele County School District. Since 2011, he has been the director of Edith Bowen Laboratory School in Utah State University. He was elected to the Utah House of Representatives in November 2020 and assumed office on January 2, 2019. Johnson served as an educator for over 49 years, and for 42 of those years he was an administrator. In March 2020, Johnson authored a bill to make school lunches for low-income students more affordable.

Representative Johnson does not currently chair any House committees. He sits on the Public Education Appropriations Subcommittee, House Education Committee, and House Transportation Committee.

References 

Living people
Peru State College alumni
University of Nebraska Omaha alumni
Argosy University alumni
University of Nebraska–Lincoln alumni
Utah State University faculty
Republican Party members of the Utah House of Representatives
Year of birth missing (living people)